American Legacy is a quarterly magazine that covers the subjects of African-American history and culture. The magazine is headquartered in Mount Vernon, New York and was founded in 1995 by Rodney J. Reynolds as a joint venture with Forbes Inc. The first issue was released in 1996. The magazine is published by RJR Communications, Inc. which became the full owner of the magazine in January 2009.

The 2007 motion picture The Great Debaters was based on an article about the Wiley College 1935 debate team that appeared in the Spring 1997 issue.

As of 2007, the magazine had circulation of 500,000, 80 percent of which was free distribution via schools, black churches, and other organizations.

References

External links
Official website*

African-American magazines
History magazines published in the United States
Quarterly magazines published in the United States
Magazines established in 1995
Magazines published in New York (state)